Hüseynabad is a village in the municipality of Kələxan in the Lerik Rayon of Azerbaijan.

References

Populated places in Lerik District